The Zozo Championship (Japanese: ゾゾ・チャンピオンシップ) is a professional golf tournament in Inzai, Chiba Prefecture, which is located in the Greater Tokyo Area of Japan. It is co-sanctioned by the Japan Golf Tour and the PGA Tour and has been sponsored by ZOZO, a Japanese clothing brand, since the event's inception in 2019.

History
The tournament is the first event sanctioned by the PGA Tour in Japan, in a deal that will last until at least 2025. It would also be co-sanctioned by the Japan Golf Tour. Tiger Woods won the inaugural event for his 82nd PGA Tour victory. This tied the all-time record set by Sam Snead. 

In 2020, the tournament was moved to Sherwood Country Club in Lake Sherwood, California in October, due to ongoing travel restrictions because of the COVID-19 pandemic. Ultimately, the 2020 event became a sole-sanctioned PGA Tour event and had no involvement from the Japan Golf Tour.

The tournament returned to Japan in 2021 as well as being sanctioned by both the PGA Tour and the Japan Golf Tour. However, it was an unofficial money event on the Japan Golf Tour. Hideki Matsuyama eagled the final hole to win in his home country by five shots ahead of Brendan Steele and Cameron Tringale.

Field
The 78-player field consists of:
 Top 60 available PGA Tour players from the previous season's FedEx Cup standings.
 Top 7 players in the current season Japan Golf Tour money list through the Bridgestone Open.
 Top 3 players in the Bridgestone Open.
 8 sponsor exemptions.

Winners

Notes

References

External links

Coverage on the PGA Tour's official site
Coverage on the Japan Golf Tour's official site

Japan Golf Tour events
PGA Tour events
Golf tournaments in Japan
Golf in California
Sport in Chiba Prefecture
Recurring sporting events established in 2019
2019 establishments in Japan